The 1880 United States presidential election in Wisconsin was held on November 2, 1880, as part of the 1880 United States presidential election. State voters chose ten electors to the Electoral College, who voted for president and vice president.

Republican Party candidate James A. Garfield won Wisconsin with 54.04 percent of the popular vote, winning the state's ten electoral votes.

Results

Results by county

Notes

References

Wisconsin
1880 Wisconsin elections
1880